Look Listen! is the first remix album by Australian rock group Boom Crash Opera, released in 1990. Look Listen! peaked at number 47 on the ARIA Charts.

Track listing

Personnel 
 Bass  –  Peter Farnan, Richard Pleasance
 Drums  – Peter Maslen
 Guitar –  Greg O'Connor, Peter Farnan, Richard Pleasance
 Keyboards –  Greg O'Connor
 Vocals –  Dale Ryder,  Peter Farnan, Peter Maslen, Richard Pleasance
 Written-By – Peter Farnan (tracks: 1, 3, 5, 7, 8,), Richard Pleasance (tracks: 2 to 5, 7, 8, 9)

References 

Boom Crash Opera albums
1990 remix albums
1990 compilation albums
Compilation albums by Australian artists
Ariola Records compilation albums